Johan Kalin (born 1978) is a Swedish football manager who served as head coach of the Nepal national football team after having managed several teams in Sweden.
Kalin is a certified coach with UEFA and other football governing bodies.

Coaching career
For the 2013–14 Martyr's Memorial A-Division League, Kalin signed as the new head coach for Machhindra F.C. He led the team to finish second in the league, for which he was praised for his tactics.  
In 2019, All Nepal Football Association signed Kalin to be the new head coach of Nepal’s national football team for two years.  His first match was a friendly against Kuwait, which ended in a 0–0 draw.

Managerial statistics
.

References

External links
 Johan Kalin interview 

Living people
Expatriate football managers in Nepal
Nepal national football team managers
Swedish football managers
Swedish expatriate football managers

1978 births
Machhindra F.C. managers
Swedish expatriate sportspeople in Nepal